Carlos Andrés Páez Rivera (22 June 1998) is a footballer from Colombia who plays as a center back for Envigado F.C.

References

1998 births
Living people
Colombian footballers
Association football defenders
Envigado F.C. players